Noël Lajoie (12 December 1927 – 24 August 2014) was a French racing cyclist. He rode in the 1950 Tour de France.

References

1927 births
2014 deaths
French male cyclists
Place of birth missing